Markus Berger (born 21 January 1985) is an Austrian professional football coach and a former central defender. He works as an individual coach at AKA Vorarlberg.

Club career
Having started his professional career at SV Ried, Berger helping to promotion to the Bundesliga in his first year, and played 14 games as the team finished in a best-ever runner-up position in 2006–07. Primeira Liga side Académica de Coimbra signed him in July 2007, as a free agent; after going almost unnoticed throughout the season, he scored in his fifth match with the Students in a 3–0 away win against S.L. Benfica.

Berger was first choice in his last two years with Académica, netting a combined four league goals in the process. During January 2009, he went on a trial period with Hibernian from the Scottish Premier League, and his agent later claimed that a loan deal had been agreed between the clubs with Hibs having the option to buy the player at the end of the campaign for £500,000, but the move was not completed.

On 30 December 2011, after nearly 100 official appearances for Académica, Berger penned a three-year contract at Ukrainian Premier League's FC Chornomorets Odesa. At the start of March 2014, he left his team due to the civil unrest caused by the 2014 Ukrainian revolution, going on to sign for Tippeligaen club IK Start late into that month. He made his debut on 6 April in a 3–1 home victory over FK Haugesund, in which he also scored his first goal.

In June 2014, after only a few months in Norway, Berger moved to the Russian Premier League with FC Ural Sverdlovsk Oblast. However, in January of the following year, he returned to Portugal after signing with Gil Vicente F.C. until the end of the season.

Berger agreed to a one-year deal with C.D. Tondela in early July 2015, after suffering relegation. He returned to his country on 20 June 2016, joining Regional League West side SV Grödig.

Personal life
Berger's older brother, Hans-Peter, was also a footballer.

Honours
Académica
Taça de Portugal: 2011–12

References

External links

 

1985 births
Footballers from Salzburg
Living people
Austrian footballers
Austria under-21 international footballers
Association football defenders
Eintracht Frankfurt II players
SV Ried players
Associação Académica de Coimbra – O.A.F. players
FC Chornomorets Odesa players
IK Start players
FC Ural Yekaterinburg players
Gil Vicente F.C. players
C.D. Tondela players
SV Grödig players
Regionalliga players
Oberliga (football) players
2. Liga (Austria) players
Austrian Football Bundesliga players
Primeira Liga players
Ukrainian Premier League players
Eliteserien players
Russian Premier League players
Austrian Regionalliga players
Austrian Landesliga players
Austrian expatriate footballers
Expatriate footballers in Germany
Austrian expatriate sportspeople in Germany
Expatriate footballers in Portugal
Austrian expatriate sportspeople in Portugal
Expatriate footballers in Ukraine
Austrian expatriate sportspeople in Ukraine
Expatriate footballers in Norway
Austrian expatriate sportspeople in Norway
Expatriate footballers in Russia
Austrian expatriate sportspeople in Russia
Austrian football managers